That Gibson Boy is a studio album by American country singer Don Gibson, released in 1959.

Track listing 
"Even Tho'" (Webb Pierce, Curt Peeples, Willie Jones)	  
"It's My Way	" (Wayne Walker, Pierce)
"Midnight" (Chet Atkins, Boudleaux Bryant)
"As Much" (Mel Tillis)
"Do You Think" (Lee Emerson)
"Didn't Work Out, Did It?" (Dave Rich)
"Won't Cha Come Back to Me" (Don Gibson)
"I Wish It Had Been a Dream" (Charlie Louvin, Ira Louvin)  
"Ages and Ages Ago" (Gene Autry, Fred Rose, Ray Whitley)
"Almost" (Vic McAlpin, Jack Toombs)
"It Has to Be" (Gibson) 
"Foggy River" (Rose)

Personnel
Don Gibson – vocals, guitar
Hank Garland – guitar
Chet Atkins – guitar
Harold Bradley – guitar
Bob Moore – bass
Buddy Harman – drums
Floyd Cramer – piano
The Anita Kerr Singers (Anita Kerr, Dottie Dillard, Louis Nunley, Bill Wright) – background vocals

See also
Nashville sound

References

1959 albums
Don Gibson albums
Albums produced by Chet Atkins